Richard Thomas Lowe (1802–1874) was an English scientist, a botanist, ichthyologist, malacologist, and a clergyman. In 1825 he graduated from Christ's College, Cambridge, and in the same year he took holy orders. In 1832 he became a clergyman in the Madeira Islands, where he was also a part-time naturalist, extensively studying the local flora and fauna. He wrote a book on the Madeiran flora. He died in 1874 when the ship he was on was wrecked off the Isles of Scilly.

Taxa
Lowe named and described numerous molluscan taxa, including:

 Caseolus, a land snail genus and eight species within it
 Lemniscia, a land snail genus and two species within it

See also
:Category:Taxa named by Richard Thomas Lowe

References

Notes

1802 births
1874 deaths
19th-century English Anglican priests
Alumni of Christ's College, Cambridge
English botanists
English ichthyologists
English malacologists
English zoologists